Deep Are the Roots is a 1945 play by Arnaud d'Usseau and James Gow about a decorated African-American soldier who has returned from World War II.

Plot
Brett is an African American who grew up in the home of a former senator as the child of a servant. He has served in World War II and been treated as an equal, and he wants to change the world. He returns to his hometown and begins a romance with Genevra, a daughter of the former senator in a town where his checking a book out of the public library causes controversy.

Production history
The play was first staged on Broadway in September 1945, directed by Elia Kazan; starring Gordon Heath and Barbara Bel Geddes, it ran for 477 performances, closing in November 1946. The New York Times noted at the time that Deep Are the Roots did not "shy away from a problem" – racism in the Southern United States.

The 1947 production in the West End of London starred Heath and Betsy Drake. Earl Cameron subsequently played the lead on tour and in various regional productions.

The play was revived at New York City's Metropolitan Playhouse in 2012.

References

1945 plays
Plays set in the United States
Plays about race and ethnicity